Martin Luther King Jr. High School is a public high school located in Cleveland, Ohio.  It is part of the Cleveland Metropolitan School District.  The school nickname is King.

History
The school was built in 1973.  Like many schools that opened in the 10 years after the 1968 assassination of Martin Luther King Jr., the school was named in honor of the famed civil rights movement leader.

Structure
The school has two "Small Schools" located in it, providing focused learning for students interested in the medical and law industry. The classes use  hands on experiences to prepare teens for college in these fields:
 Health Careers. Health Careers offers programs in STNA, Dental Assisting, and Personal Training.
 School for Law & Municipal Careers. Law & Municipal offers programs in Security forces, Firefighting, and EMT.

Notable alumni

External links
 District Website

Notes and references

High schools in Cuyahoga County, Ohio
Education in Cleveland
Educational institutions established in 1972
Public high schools in Ohio
Cleveland Metropolitan School District
School buildings completed in 1973
1972 establishments in Ohio